This is a list of the Honduras national football team results from 1990 to 1999.

1990

1991

1992

1993

1994

1995

1996

1997
In 1997, Honduras participated in the UNCAF Nations Cup held in Guatemala.  Some historians wrongly denote a friendly match between Honduras and Chile supposedly being played on 26 January in Santiago with a 3–2 victory for the South Americans; however, such game never took place.  The confusion apparently derives from an exhibition game played that day between domestic clubs Universidad Católica and Olimpia in Miami, which ended 3–2 for the Chileans.

1998

1999
In 1999, Honduras faced an African nation for the first time when they defeated Zambia in a friendly match with a 7–1 score.

Record

References

1990s